Orlat may refer to:

Orlat, a commune in Sibiu County, Transylvania, Romania
Orlat (river), a tributary of the Săliște in Sibiu County, Romania
Orlat cemetery (disambiguation), multiple locations
Sidi Ahmed Orlat, a 14th-century ruler of an independent state of Shaki, Azerbaijan